{{Infobox university
| name           = Priyadarshini College of Engineering, Nagpur.
| native_name    = प्रियदर्शनी अभियांत्रिकी महाविद्यालय, नागपूर| image          = priyadarshini logo.jpg
| motto             = तन्त्रज्ञानं प्रसारयितव्यम् एवं
| mottoeng          =
| established       = 1990
| closed            =  
| type              = Un-Aided Private
| affiliation       = AICTE, Nagpur University
| endowment         = 
| budget            = 
| rector            = 
| principal         = Dr M.P.Singh
| officer_in_charge = 
| chairman          = 
| director          = 
| Registrar         =
| dean              =

Dr. J. P. Modak, (Research & Development) Dr. K. S. Zakiuddin, (Academics) Dr. M. M. Nanoti,  (Students Counselling) Dr. H. Hazare,  AICTE/DTE Coordinator
| head_label        = 
| head              = 
| academic_staff    = 268
| administrative_staff  = 
| students          = 
| undergrad         = 3794(approx)
| postgrad          = 300(approx)
| doctoral          = 60
| other             = 
| city              = Near CRPF Campus, Hingna Road, Nagpur, Pin-440019 
| state             = Maharashtra 
| province          =  
| country           = India
| coor              = 
| campus            = Urban  
| former_names      = Priyadarshini College of Engineering Nagpur.
| free_label        = Acronym
| free              = PCE
| athletics         = 
| colours           = 
| sports            = 
| nickname          = 
| mascot            = 
| affiliations      = 
| website           = pce.ltjss.net  Alumni : pcealumni.com
}}Priyadarshini College of Engineering'  is an engineering college in Nagpur (1 of 15) that offers degree programmes in 8 engineering disciplines (electronics and telecommunications, aeronautics, mechanical, electrical, electronics, civil, computer technology and information technology). It also offers 3 programmes in mechanical, electrical and electronics engineering. The Institute also offers MCA and MBA programmes.

 History 
The Priyadarshini College of Engineering, Nagpur (formerly Priyadarshini College of Engineering & Architecture) was established in 1990 by Shri Satish Chaturvedi under Lokmanya Tilak Jankalyan Shikshan Sanstha. It is the second leading engineering college in Digdoh region. The Institute has been accredited in all ranches by the National Board of Accreditation, New Delhi and awarded Grade A by Government of Maharashtra for its infrastructure and its academic achievements.

 Campus 

The college occupies a  piece of hilly terrain in the Digdoh hills at Nagpur. 

The institute has 5 hostels for 650 boys and 3 hostels for 350 girls with all amenities.

The campus has swimming pools, auditoriums, a computer center, sporting facilities, bank branches, cafes, coffee shops, and a co-operative store.

 Departments 
PCE Nagpur has various academic departments, with specialized laboratories and research centers. The following departments for higher study and research have been in continuous operation:

Applied Chemistry
Applied Mathematics
Applied Physics
Department of Humanities
Mechanical Engineering
Aeronautical Engineering
Civil Engineering
Electrical Engineering
Electronics Engineering
Electronics and Telecommunication Engineering
Computer Technology
Information Technology

 Academic programmes 
Engineering undergraduate programs are usually four-years, while postgraduate programs are two-year programs. The institute is a recognised centre for research programmes by Nagpur University.

Undergraduate courses

PG courses

 Admissions 
Admission to the institute is through the Centralized Admission Process (CAP), based on exams such as SEEE and AIEEE. 50% of the seats are filled through CAP while the rest are filled through the Management Quota. Direct second year admission is granted to diploma-passed students according to available vacancies.

 Extracurricular activities 
 Tuning Fork - Cultural Club Of PCE - A students platform to showcase and polish there talent in fields like singing, dancing, acting, music, poetry, anchoring, photography, designing etc.
 Concretia - A student Forum Of Master of Computer Application(MCA)
 SCOoP - A Students Forum of Computer Technology Department which stands for Students Computer Organisation of Priyadarshini
 MESCo - A students Forum of Mechanical Engineering Department (II shift)
 MESA - A Students Forum of Mechanical Engineering Department
 EESF - A Students Forum of Electrical Engineering Department
 TELE-ERA - A Students Forum of Electronics & Telecommunication Department
 EXESS - A Students Forum of Electronics Engineering Department
 DIGITS - A students forum of Information Technology Department
 EAGLE - A Students Forum of Aeronautical Engineering Department
 Jigyasa - annual 3-days event. It has a central theme as well as departmental themes. It organizes national level paper presentations, poster presentations, and project presentations along with an Industrial Fair. JIGYASA 07 attracted 2000 papers from across the country.
 Ashwamedh - Ashwamedh'' is a biennial event in which students participate in dancing, singing, drama, etc.

Events 
Aeronautical engineering department organises Pranodanan, an intercollege event 
Aeronautical engineering department organised Vaimanika, a two day national symposium and the Indian Aeromodeling Competition in  February 2018. In collaborations with the Aeronautical society of India
 Technical Event - Technologia
 Sports Event - Udaan
 Cultural Event  - Eknaad

Library 
The library hosts books, national and international journals and magazines, totaling over 11000 titles and around 40,000 volumes. The library subscribes to over 35 international journals and 60 journals and magazines. The library has a multimedia facility with a language lab where the students can listen to lectures on over 700 Engineering and non-engineering topics.

References

External links
LTJSS

Engineering colleges in Nagpur